The Antiquarian Booksellers' Association (ABA) is the senior trade body in the British Isles for dealers in antiquarian and rare books, manuscripts and allied materials. The ABA organises a number of book fairs every year including its flagship fair held at Olympia, London in May, which features exhibitors from all around the world, and the Chelsea Antiquarian Book Fair in November. Fairs are held in Edinburgh in March and Bristol in July in conjunction with the Provincial Book Fairs Association. The ABA sponsors the London Rare Books School, the York Antiquarian Book Seminar, and a series of seminars at the University of London. The ABA Office is located on Bell Yard, off Fleet Street and next to the Royal Courts of Justice.

History
It was founded in 1906 and is the oldest organisation of its kind in the world.  Its membership also extends to many leading booksellers overseas. The ABA is run by a professional secretariat under the overall control of an elected President and Council.

Presidents originally served for one year, although the term increased to two years from the 1940s. The first President of the association was Henry N Stevens in 1907, who was followed by B.D Maggs of London Booksellers Maggs Bros. Other notable past presidents include Robert Bowes of Bowes & Bowes (1914), Sir Basil Blackwell (1925-6), Frederic Sutherland Ferguson (1934), Percy Muir of Elkin Mathews (1946-7), Anthony Rota (1971-2), Hylton Bayntun-Coward (1980-2 and 1992-3) and Adrian Harrington (2001-3).

ABA standards 
Members are elected solely on the basis of proven experience, expertise and integrity. They are expected to observe the highest professional and ethical standards and to foster mutual trust between the trade and the public. Applicants for membership must have been full-time professional antiquarian booksellers for five consecutive years before becoming eligible. Applicants for Associate membership must have been full-time professional antiquarian booksellers for a minimum of two consecutive years before becoming eligible. Members are bound by the Articles of Association and Rules, as well as the most stringent Code of Good Practice yet adopted anywhere in the world of books.

The display of the ABA badge, which is a Registered Trade Mark, pledges members to:
 the authenticity of all material offered for sale
 the expert and proper description of all such material
 the disclosure of all significant defects or restorations
 the clear, accurate and professional pricing of all material
 the fairness and honesty of offers to purchase.

Definition 
Antiquarian booksellers are defined as individuals, sole traders, partnerships, companies, and corporations having antiquarian book departments, routinely and professionally engaged in purchasing, valuing, pricing and selling antiquarian books.

Members with entries on Wikipedia 
 Sir David Attenborough (Honorary Member)
 George Bayntun
 Simon Beattie
 Robert Bowes
 Clive Farahar
 Colin Franklin (writer and bibliographer)
 Rick Gekoski
 Jon Gilbert (bibliographer)
 Adrian Harrington
 Maggs Bros Ltd
 Neil Pearson
 Bernard Quaritch
 Robert Temple Booksellers
 Hyraxia Books

See also
 List of booksellers associations
 Book trade in the United Kingdom
 Books in the United Kingdom

External links
 
 International League of Antiquarian Booksellers (ILAB)
 Terms of the Trade

Antiquarian booksellers
Organizations established in 1906
Trade associations based in the United Kingdom
Organisations based in the City of Westminster
Bookshops of the United Kingdom
1906 establishments in the United Kingdom
Presidents of the Antiquarian Booksellers' Association